The 1852 United States presidential election in Massachusetts took place on November 2, 1852, as part of the 1852 United States presidential election. Voters chose 13 representatives, or electors to the Electoral College, who voted for President and Vice President.

Massachusetts voted for the Whig Party candidate, Winfield Scott, over the Democratic candidate, Franklin Pierce. Scott won the state by a narrow margin of 6.38%.

Massachusetts was one of the four states to vote for Scott. The other three were Kentucky, Tennessee and Vermont.

Free Soil Party candidate John P. Hale won 22.05% of the vote in the state, making Massachusetts his strongest state.

Daniel Webster died 9 days before the election of a cerebral hemorrhage on October 24, 1852. This caused many Union and Native American state parties to remove him and his running mate Charles Jones Jenkins from their slates of electors and was replaced by Jacob Broom and Reynell Coates. The Webster-Jenkins Union ticket however, remained on the ballot in both Massachusetts and Georgia.

Results

See also
 United States presidential elections in Massachusetts

References

Massachusetts
1852
1852 Massachusetts elections